Zealaranea is a genus of orb-weaver spiders first described by D. J. Court & Raymond Robert Forster in 1988.

Species
 it contains four species, all found in New Zealand:
Zealaranea crassa (Walckenaer, 1841) (type) – New Zealand
Zealaranea prina Court & Forster, 1988 – New Zealand
Zealaranea saxitalis (Urquhart, 1887) – New Zealand
Zealaranea trinotata (Urquhart, 1890) – New Zealand

References

Araneidae
Araneomorphae genera
Spiders of New Zealand
Taxa named by Raymond Robert Forster